Massachusetts Senate's Plymouth and Barnstable district in the United States is one of 40 legislative districts of the Massachusetts Senate. It covers 33.3% of Barnstable County and 17.6% of Plymouth County population. Democrat Susan Moran of Falmouth has represented the district since May 2020, after a special election was called when Republican Vinny deMacedo of Plymouth resigned in November 2019.

Towns represented
The district includes the following localities:
 Bourne
 Falmouth
 Kingston
 Pembroke
 Plymouth
 Sandwich

Senators 
 Edward Kirby, circa 1991
 Therese Murray, circa 1993-2015 
 Vinny M. deMacedo, 2015-2019
 Susan L. Moran, 2020-Current

Images
Portraits of legislators

See also
 List of Massachusetts Senate elections
 Barnstable County districts of the Massachusetts House of Representatives: 1st, 2nd, 3rd, 4th, 5th; Barnstable, Dukes and Nantucket
 Plymouth County districts of the Massachusetts House of Representatives: 1st, 2nd, 3rd, 4th, 5th, 6th, 7th, 8th, 9th, 10th, 11th, 12th
 List of Massachusetts General Courts
 List of former districts of the Massachusetts Senate

References

Further reading

External links
 Ballotpedia
  (State Senate district information based on U.S. Census Bureau's American Community Survey).
 
 League of Women Voters of the Cape Cod Area

Senate 
Government of Barnstable County, Massachusetts
Government of Plymouth County, Massachusetts
Massachusetts Senate